Jack McManus may refer to:
 Jack McManus (gangster)
 Jack McManus (singer)
 Jack McManus (ice hockey)

See also
 John McManus (disambiguation)